FC Dzhalal-Abad is a Kyrgyzstani football club based in Jalal-Abad, Kyrgyzstan that played in the top division in Kyrgyzstan, the Kyrgyzstan League.

History 
1969: Founded as FC Stroitel Dzhalal-Abad.
1990: Renamed to FC Khimik Dzhalal-Abad.
1992: Renamed to FC Kokart Dzhalal-Abad.
1996: Renamed to FC Dzhalal-Abad.
1997: Renamed to FC Dinamo Dzhalal-Abad.
1998: Renamed to FC Dzhalal-Abad.
1999: Renamed to FC Dinamo Dzhalal-Abad.
2000: Renamed to FC Dinamo-KPK Dzhalal-Abad.
2002: Renamed to FC Dzhalal-Abad.
2003: Renamed to FC Doma Ata Dzhalal-Abad.
2003: Dissolved.
2004: Renamed to FC Dzhalal-Abad.
2005: Renamed to FC Asyl Dzhalal-Abad.
2006: Renamed to FC Dzhalal-Abad.
2008: Renamed to FC Nashe Pivo Dzhalal-Abad.
2009: Renamed to FC Kambar-Ata Dzhalal-Abad.
2009: Dissolved.
2013: Renamed to FC Asyl Dzhalal-Abad.
2015: Renamed to FC Dzhalal-Abad.

Achievements 
Kyrgyzstan League:
6th place: 2002

Kyrgyzstan Cup:
1/4 finals: 1998, 2000

Current squad

External links 
Career stats by KLISF
Profile at Weltfussballarchiv
Profile at Footballfacts
Profile at Wildstat

Football clubs in Kyrgyzstan
1969 establishments in the Kirghiz Soviet Socialist Republic